Zane Denis Navratil is an American professional pickleball player. He is ranked No. 3 in singles play by the Pro Pickleball Association (PPA) and No. 9 and 2 for doubles and singles respectively by the Association of Pickleball Professionals (APP). He has had a sponsorship with Franklin Sports since 2021. He has won over 80 medals over the course of his professional career. Players and commentators (including Navratil himself) have nicknamed Zane "Gucci" as a reference to his tremendous skill in the sport.

Personal life
Navratil was raised in Racine, Wisconsin. For most of his childhood, he attended The Prairie School in Racine, Wisconsin. Zane is known to have a good sense of humor, which developed as a coping method for normal middle-school bullying. Zane has a girlfriend, Jennifer, who he has dated since high school. He claims to have bullied her himself in middle school, stating, "the more I insult you, the more I like you!" Zane and his girlfriend own a dog named Murray, who has his own social media accounts.

Navratil graduated from the University of Wisconsin Whitewater with a master's degree in accounting. He was then able to secure a job at Deloitte & Touche LLP in Milwaukee before eventually quitting that job to play pickleball professionally.

Zane enjoys good relationships with both his mother Dimple and his father Denis. Though Dimple was originally skeptical of Zane's career choices, after his success in the sport, Zane said, "no one's happier about this than my mom."

Pickleball career
Navratil enjoyed a variety of sports from a young age, including tennis. Zane picked up tennis at the age of 10, and began putting a good deal of time and effort into the sport at the age of 12. From 2012 to 2014, he had some success playing division II tennis, winning three Wisconsin state championships for The Prairie School.

His first exposure to pickleball occurred in the winter of 2013–2014, when Zane's father brought him to the Cesar Chavez Community Center in Racine. Zane was initially skeptical, believing the common misconception that pickleball is solely an "old person's game." He was quickly convinced otherwise after playing several games with local residents. Navratil later said of those first few games, "I got my butt kicked by some 70-plus-year-old people. That showed me there’s a lot of finesse in the game. I just couldn’t overpower people. I had to play smart and learn the strategy and whatnot to be able to succeed at it."

Over the next several years, Navratil played as an amateur in tournaments, having varied success. In 2020, Zane quit his job at Deloitte to pursue pickleball full time. He quickly rose through the professional rankings and is considered by many to be one of the best pickleball players in the world, second only to No. 1 player Ben Johns.

In March 2021, Navratil signed a sponsorship deal with Franklin Sports. Zane frequently uses the Ben Johns Signature Paddle that Franklin produces. Franklin produced a blue edition of the paddle to match Navratil's brand colors shortly after signing the sponsorship deal. Franklin and Navratil have also been in talks to produce a Zane Navratil Signature Paddle, though no release date has been set.

Navratil hosts pickleball clinics around the country, teaching between 16 and 32 people a day. These clinics generally cost $75 per person per day, making up the majority of Zane's current income.

He is also famous for pioneering new varieties of serves, including the chainsaw serve, which has since been adapted by numerous other professional players, including Ben Johns.

Playing style

Navratil is known for his exceptional footwork and court coverage. Specifically on defense, Navratil is able to return shots from his opponents that, against most players, would be winners.

Although not known for his exceptional power, Navratil is able to take control of points immediately with his infamous chainsaw serve, which creates a large amount of topspin. This serve often forces weak returns out of his opponents, allowing Navratil to close in on the net and take control of the point from there. However, due to the risk involved in Navratil's serve, Navratil faults on his service more than the average professional player.

The biggest weakness in Navratil's game comes from his predictability. The biggest contrast between the playing style of Navratil and Ben Johns is that Johns is able to add strokes to his game that his opponents do not foresee, often catching them off-guard. What Navratil lacks in craftiness, he makes up for in his consistent and powerful groundstrokes.

References

1995 births
Living people
People from Brookfield, Wisconsin
Pickleball players
Sportspeople from Wisconsin